1993 in sports describes the year's events in world sport.

Alpine skiing
 Alpine Skiing World Cup
 Women's overall season champion: Anita Wachter, Austria

American football
 Super Bowl XXVII – the Dallas Cowboys (NFC) won 52–17 over the Buffalo Bills (AFC)
Location: Rose Bowl
Attendance: 98,374
MVP: Troy Aikman, QB (Dallas)
 Sugar Bowl (1992 season):
 The Alabama Crimson Tide won 34-13 over the Miami Hurricanes to win the national championship
 Bobby Dodd was inducted into the College Football Hall of Fame

Association football
 February 24 – death of Bobby Moore, former England captain, from cancer
 May – Manchester United win the inaugural English Premier League title, their first league title in 26 years.
 UEFA Champions League – Olympique de Marseille defeats A.C. Milan 1–0. Marseille is later banned from defending their title the next year due to a corruption scandal.
 The Zambian national team are all killed in an air crash near Libreville, Gabon. The team was travelling to Senegal to play a qualifying match for the 1994 FIFA World Cup.

Athletics
 February 11 – Irina Privalova sets a new women's 60m indoors world record
 August – 1993 World Championships in Athletics held in Stuttgart
 September – Qu Yunxia sets a World Record of 3:50.46 in the women's 1500 m
 September – Wang Junxia sets new world records of 29:31.78 in the women's 10,000 m and 8:06.11 in the women's 3000m

Baseball
 The Colorado Rockies and Florida Marlins (now Miami Marlins) play their inaugural seasons (both are National League teams) as MLB expands for the first time in 16 seasons.
 Randy Myers saves 53 games for the Chicago Cubs, breaking Dave Righetti's record for left-handers.
 Lee Smith breaks the all-time save mark by recording his 358th save in a 9–7 win against the Los Angeles Dodgers on April 13
 World Series – The Toronto Blue Jays win 4 games to 2 over the Philadelphia Phillies. The Series MVP is Paul Molitor, Toronto. Joe Carter hit the second ever walk-off home run to end the 1993 World Series, the first by an American League player.

Basketball
 NCAA Men's Basketball Championship –
 North Carolina wins 77–71 over Michigan
 NBA Finals –
 Chicago Bulls win 4 games to 2 over the Phoenix Suns to complete their first three-peat of the decade (see John Paxson). Michael Jordan announced his retirement on October 6, only to return seventeen months later.
 National Basketball League (Australia) Finals:
 Melbourne Tigers defeated the Perth Wildcats 2–1 in the best-of-three final series.
 Eurobasket 1993 won by Germany

Boxing
 March 13 – Michael Carbajal comes off the floor twice to knock out Humberto González in seven rounds and unify the world's Jr. Flyweight title in the fight of the year
 May 7 to 16 – World Amateur Boxing Championships held in Tampere, Finland
 September 6 to 12 – 30th European Amateur Boxing Championships held in Bursa, Turkey.

Canadian football
 Grey Cup – Edmonton Eskimos win 33–23 over the Winnipeg Blue Bombers
 Vanier Cup – Toronto Varsity Blues won 37–34 over Calgary Dinos

Cricket
 June 4 – Shane Warne bowls the so-called "Ball of the Century" to Mike Gatting in the first Test at Old Trafford
 The Ashes – Australia defeated England 4–0 in England

Cycling
 Giro d'Italia won by Miguel Indurain of Spain
 Tour de France – Miguel Indurain of Spain
 UCI Road World Championships – Men's road race – Lance Armstrong of United States
 Hour record – Graeme Obree of Great Britain
 Hour record – Chris Boardman of Great Britain

Dogsled racing
 Iditarod Trail Sled Dog Race Champion –
 Jeff King won with lead dogs: Herbie & Kitty

Field hockey
 Men's Champions Trophy: Australia

Figure skating
 World Figure Skating Championships –
 Men's champion: Kurt Browning, Canada
 Ladies' champion: Oksana Baiul, Ukraine
 Pairs' champions: Isabelle Brasseur & Lloyd Eisler, Canada
 Ice dancing champions: Maya Usova & Alexander Zhulin, Russia

Floorball 
 European Cup
 Men's champion: Balrog IK
 Women's champion: VK Rasket

Gaelic Athletic Association
 Camogie
 All-Ireland Camogie Champion: Cork
 National Camogie League: Kilkenny
 Gaelic football
 All-Ireland Senior Football Championship – Derry 1–14 died Cork 2–8
 National Football League – Dublin 0–10 died Donegal 0–6 (replay)
 Ladies' Gaelic football
 All-Ireland Senior Football Champion: Kerry
 National Football League: Laois
 Hurling
 All-Ireland Senior Hurling Championship – Kilkenny 2–17 died Galway 1–15

Golf
Men's professional
 Masters Tournament – Bernhard Langer
 U.S. Open – Lee Janzen
 British Open – Greg Norman
 PGA Championship – Paul Azinger
 PGA Tour money leader – Nick Price – $1,478,557
 Senior PGA Tour money leader – Dave Stockton – $1,175,944
 Ryder Cup – United States won 15–13 over Europe in team golf.
Men's amateur
 British Amateur – Iain Pyman
 U.S. Amateur – John Harris
 European Amateur – Morten Backhausen
Women's professional
 Nabisco Dinah Shore – Helen Alfredsson
 LPGA Championship – Patty Sheehan
 U.S. Women's Open – Lauri Merten
 Classique du Maurier – Brandie Burton
 LPGA Tour money leader – Betsy King – $595,992

Harness racing
 North America Cup – Presidential Ball
 United States Pacing Triple Crown races –
 Cane Pace – Riyadh
 Little Brown Jug – Life Sign
 Messenger Stakes – Riyadh
 United States Trotting Triple Crown races –
 Hambletonian – American Winner
 Yonkers Trot – American Winner
 Kentucky Futurity – Pine Chip
 Australian Inter Dominion Harness Racing Championship –
 Pacers: Jack Morris
 Trotters: Night Allowance

Horse racing
 Julie Krone, the all-time leading female jockey, became the first woman ever to win a Triple Crown race when she rode Colonial Affair to victory in the Belmont Stakes.
Steeplechases
 Cheltenham Gold Cup – Jodami
 Grand National – race void
Flat races
 Australia – Melbourne Cup won by Vintage Crop
 Canadian Triple Crown Races:
 Queen's Plate won by Peteski
 Prince of Wales Stakes won by Peteski
 Breeders' Stakes won by Peteski
 Peteski becomes the fourth horse in five years to sweep the series.
 France – Prix de l'Arc de Triomphe won by Urban Sea
 Ireland – Irish Derby Stakes won by; Commander in Chief
 Japan – Japan Cup won by Legacy World
 English Triple Crown Races:
 2,000 Guineas Stakes – Zafonic
 The Derby – Commander in Chief
 St. Leger Stakes – Bob's Return
 United States Triple Crown Races:
 Kentucky Derby – Sea Hero
 Preakness Stakes – Prairie Bayou
 Belmont Stakes – Colonial Affair
 Breeders' Cup World Thoroughbred Championships:
 Breeders' Cup Classic – Arcangues
 Breeders' Cup Distaff – Hollywood Wildcat
 Breeders' Cup Juvenile – Brocco
 Breeders' Cup Juvenile Fillies – Phone Chatter
 Breeders' Cup Mile – Lure
 Breeders' Cup Sprint – Cardmania
 Breeders' Cup Turf – Kotashaan

Ice hockey
 Art Ross Trophy as the NHL's leading scorer during the regular season: Mario Lemieux, Pittsburgh Penguins
 Hart Memorial Trophy for the NHL's Most Valuable Player: Mario Lemieux, Pittsburgh Penguins
 Stanley Cup – Montreal Canadiens win 4 games to 1 over the Los Angeles Kings
 World Hockey Championship
 Men's champion: Russia defeated Sweden
 Junior Men's champion: Canada won over Sweden
 Mighty Ducks of Anaheim (now Anaheim Ducks) play inaugural season.
 Florida Panthers play inaugural season.

Kickboxing
The following is a list of major noteworthy kickboxing events during 1993 in chronological order.

Before 2000, K-1 was considered the only major kickboxing promotion in the world.

|-
|align=center style="border-style: none none solid solid; background: #e3e3e3"|Date
|align=center style="border-style: none none solid solid; background: #e3e3e3"|Event
|align=center style="border-style: none none solid solid; background: #e3e3e3"|Location
|align=center style="border-style: none none solid solid; background: #e3e3e3"|Attendance
|align=center style="border-style: none none solid solid; background: #e3e3e3"|Notes
|-align=center
|March 30
|K-1 Sanctuary I
| Tokyo, Japan
|2,100
|
|-align=center
|April 30
|K-1 Grand Prix '93
| Tokyo, Japan
|12,000
|
|-align=center
|June 25
|K-1 Sanctuary III
| Osaka, Japan
|6,000
|
|-align=center
|September 4
|K-1 Illusion
| Tokyo, Japan
|13,500
|
|-align=center
|October 2, 3
|K-1 Illusion 1993 Karate World Cup
| Osaka, Japan
|
|
|-align=center
|November 15
|K-1 Andy's Glove
| Osaka, Japan
|2,100
|
|-align=center
|December 29
|K-2 Grand Prix '93
| Tokyo, Japan
|11,000
|
|-align=center

Lacrosse
 The Buffalo Bandits defeat the Philadelphia Wings to win the Major Indoor Lacrosse League championship

Mixed martial arts
The following is a list of major noteworthy MMA events during 1993 in chronological order.

Before 1997, the Ultimate Fighting Championship (UFC) was considered the only major MMA organization in the world and featured much fewer rules then are used in modern MMA.

|-
|align=center style="border-style: none none solid solid; background: #e3e3e3"|Date
|align=center style="border-style: none none solid solid; background: #e3e3e3"|Event
|align=center style="border-style: none none solid solid; background: #e3e3e3"|Alternate Name/s
|align=center style="border-style: none none solid solid; background: #e3e3e3"|Location
|align=center style="border-style: none none solid solid; background: #e3e3e3"|Attendance
|align=center style="border-style: none none solid solid; background: #e3e3e3"|PPV Buyrate
|align=center style="border-style: none none solid solid; background: #e3e3e3"|Notes
|-align=center
|November 12
|The Ultimate Fighting Championship
|UFC 1: The Beginning
| Denver, Colorado, United States
|2,800
|86,000
|
|-align=center

Motorsport

Radiosport
 The Friendship Radiosport Games held in Victoria, British Columbia are the first international Amateur Radio Direction Finding competition ever held in Canada.

Rugby league
 1992-93 RFL Championship won by Wigan
 RL Challenge Cup tournament culminates in Wigan's 20–14 win over Widnes in the final at Wembley Stadium before 77,684
 1993 State of Origin won by New South Wales in game two of the three-match series against Queensland at the Sydney Football Stadium before 41,895.
 1993 NSWRL season culminates in a repeat of the previous year's grand final with the Brisbane Broncos again defeating the St George Dragons, this time 14–6 at the Sydney Football Stadium before 42,329.

Rugby union
 99th Five Nations Championship series is won by France

Snooker
 World Snooker Championship – Stephen Hendry beats Jimmy White 18–5
 World rankings – Stephen Hendry remains world number one for 1993/94

Swimming
 21st European LC Championships, held in Sheffield, United Kingdom (August 3 – 8)
 Germany wins the most medals (21), and the most gold medals (11)
 Third European Sprint Championships, held in Gateshead, United Kingdom (November 11 – 13)
 Germany wins the most medals (17), Sweden the most gold medals (6)
 First World Short Course Championships, held in Palma de Mallorca, Spain (December 2 – 5)
 United States and Australia win the most medals (21), China the most gold medals (10)
 February 17 – Mark Foster breaks the world record in the men's 50m freestyle (short course) at a swimming meet in Sheffield, United Kingdom, clocking 21.60.

Taekwondo
 World Championships held in New York City, United States

Tennis
 April 30 – during a changeover at a tournament in Hamburg, Germany, Monica Seles is stabbed in the back by a deranged fan of rival Steffi Graf. Seles would not play competitively for more than two years after the incident.
 Grand Slam in tennis men's results:
 Australian Open – Jim Courier
 French Open – Sergi Bruguera
 Wimbledon championships – Pete Sampras
 U.S. Open – Pete Sampras
 Grand Slam in tennis women's results:
 Australian Open – Monica Seles
 French Open – Steffi Graf
 Wimbledon championships – Steffi Graf
 U.S. Open – Steffi Graf
 Davis Cup of world tennis won by Germany 4–1 over Australia

Triathlon
ITU World Championships held in Manchester, United Kingdom
ITU World Cup (nine races) started in Japan and ended in the United States Virgin Islands
ETU European Championships held in Echternach, Luxembourg

Volleyball
 Men's World League: Brazil
 Women's World Grand Prix: Cuba
 Women's European Championship: Russia

Water polo
 Men's World Cup: Italy
 Men's European Championship: Italy
 Women's European Championship: Netherlands

Multi-sport events
 First East Asian Games held in Shanghai, China
 Fourth World Games held in The Hague, Netherlands
 Central American and Caribbean Games held in Ponce, Puerto Rico
 Twelfth Mediterranean Games held in Languedoc-Roussillon, France
 Seventeenth Summer Universiade held in Buffalo, New York, United States
 Sixteenth Winter Universiade held in Zakopane, Poland

Awards
 Associated Press Male Athlete of the Year – Michael Jordan, NBA basketball
 Associated Press Female Athlete of the Year – Sheryl Swoopes, College basketball
 ABC's Wide World of Sports Athlete of the Year: Evander Holyfield, American boxer

References

 
Sports by year